The Ministry of Housing, Construction and Sanitation of Peru is the government ministry responsible for housing materials and construction, as well as the water supply. , the minister of housing, construction and sanitation is Hania Pérez de Cuéllar.

References
 Official Page Of The Ministry Of Housing, Construction And Sanitation Of Peru

Politics of Peru
Housing, Construction and Sanitation